is a tactical role-playing game published by Enix for the Famicom. It was released exclusively in Japan in 1992. Although it is somewhat obscure and was overlooked due to its late release, it is notable for its long development and as one of the largest RPGs created for the Famicom.

Gameplay
The game's six main characters each have their own armies of six soldiers, making the total number of troops thirty-six.
Each character has a set character class, which allots them fixed attributes and allows some of them to learn and use certain spells. The leaders are well-rounded Heroes that use both weapons and magic. Wizards rely almost entirely on powerful magic. Fighters battle close-range with a number of weapons. Archers attack from afar using arrows. As in traditional RPGs, battles earn each character experience points which go towards a level up, increasing that character's stats such as hit points, strength, defense, and wisdom.

The gameplay in Just Breed is based on turn-based strategy similar to that of Fire Emblem or Shining Force. The game utilizes a battle system known as "Team Spirits," in which all the units in one army act one after the other. Each character and enemy occupies a single unit on the battlefield. Using a cursor, the player can select an army and execute actions with each character within that army, such as moving or attacking a nearby target, or may view the stats of an enemy. Monster dens on the overworld continuously spawn monsters until a character is moved within range to "unarm" them.

While not in battle, the player can explore towns in which one can purchase items and equipment, engage in storyline events, or casually interact with numerous non-playable characters. Commands can also be used to speak, search the ground, use items and magic, or arrange equipment.

Plot
The game's story opens in the town of Astholm, which is spiritually protected by a sapphire wielded by the priestess Firis. She is one of six priestesses charged with holding a special gem to have together held an archaic power for several generations. During the town's Sapphire Festival, Firis is kidnapped by the henchman of Ezelkiel, a man bent on collecting the priestesses to revive an ancient evil. The player takes on the role of the nameless Hero who, along with being sworn to protect Astholm, is the lover of Firis. He immediately sets out with his army to rescue the priestess and ends up becoming involved in a much larger-scale predicament involving the world's other priestesses and gems.

Development
Just Breed was announced nearly three years before its release, which took place towards the end of the Famicom's lifecycle. The game was programmed by Kazuro Morita's game company Random House. Manga artist Yuzo Takada, best known for 3×3 Eyes series, designed both the characters and monsters, while anime composer Kōhei Tanaka scored the game. The cartridge for Just Breed includes the MMC5 chip, which boosts the game's graphics and sound. At 6 megabits, it is lauded as one of the largest RPGs for the system. The game was never released outside Japan but an unofficial English patch was created by Stealth Translations in 2004.

Merchandise
Shogakukan published a 144-page strategy guide for the game in January 1993. A 57-page illustration book titled The World of Just Breed was published by Futabasha on June 20, 1993, featuring all of the game's artwork by Yuzo Takada. Futabasha also published a 255-page light novel as part of its fantasy novel series in October 1993.

References

External links
 

1992 video games
Enix games
Japan-exclusive video games
Nintendo Entertainment System games
Nintendo Entertainment System-only games
Tactical role-playing video games
Video games developed in Japan
Video games scored by Kohei Tanaka